Loader can refer to:

 Loader (equipment)
 Loader (computing)
 LOADER.EXE, an auto-start program loader optionally used in the startup process of Microsoft Windows ME
 Loader (surname)
 Fast loader
 Speedloader
 Boot loader
 LOADER.COM (aka "NEWLDR"), a multi-boot loader shipping with various Digital Research, Novell, IMS, Caldera, etc. DOS-based operating systems like Multiuser DOS and DR-DOS
 LOADER.SYS, part of a LOADER.COM installation (see above)
 Clapper loader (on a film crew, also simply known as "loader")
 A loader, a member of a crew responsible for handling and loading ammunition, such as on a howitzer or tank crew
 Autoloader, an automated replacement for a crewer loader

See also
Loder
NEWLDR